The 1993 Damallsvenskan was the sixth season of the Damallsvenskan. Matches were played between 24 April and 23 October  1993. Malmö FF won the title by four points from Jitex BK/JG93. Gideonsbergs IF finished third. Jitex BK/JG 93 were formed from Jitex and GAIS' women's football team. As a result of Jitex and GAIS forming one team, three teams were promoted instead of two. The three teams were AIK, Mallbackens IF and Tyresö FF. Mallbacken were relegated again, along with Lindsdals IF.

Rankings

References

Damallsvenskan seasons
1993 in Swedish sport